Anaclastic may refer to:

 Anaclastic lens
 Substitution (poetry)